Péter Hunčík (in his native Hungarian order of names, Hunčík Péter; 25 May 1951 in Šahy (Ipolysag), Czechoslovakia, now Slovakia) is a Slovak psychiatrist of Hungarian ethnicity and a successful literary author, living in Slovakia.

In late 2009, shortly before his 59th birthday, he shocked the Hungarian-speaking literary world by winning the prestigious Sándor Bródy prize, given annually to an author for the best first novel of the year.

As a psychiatrist, he authored several books,  such as Tension Anticipation System (with Sándor Bordás, 1999), and its original, Hungarian version, Feszültség-Előrejelző Rendszer (1999).

In politics, he advocates normalization of bilateral relations between Hungary and Slovakia. He also authored two books, Magyarok Szlovákiában 1989-2004 ("Hungarians in Slovakia", with József Fazekas, 2004), and Global Report on Slovakia, (with Martin Butora, 1997). He was briefly an advisor to Czechoslovakian President Václav Havel. At this time he played a role in setting up TV Nova. He strongly opposed the separation of Czechoslovakia into the independent countries of the Czech Republic and Slovakia.

In 2009, he won the aforementioned Sándor Bródy award with his novel Határeset ("Borderline Case" or "Borderline Story"), after five years of work. This prize is often given to writers in their twenties or thirties. György Dragomán is one famous former awardee.

Péter Hunčík lives in the city of Dunajská Streda (Dunaszerdahely) where he owns a private practice in psychiatry.

References

1951 births
Living people
People from Šahy
Hungarians in Slovakia
Hungarian writers